Calderone is an Italian-language occupational surname. It is derived from the Vulgar Latin "caldaria" ("cauldron") and refers to the occupation of tinker.

The surname may refer to:

Antonino Calderone (1935–2013), Sicilian Mafioso who turned state witness in 1987
Eric Calderone (born 1985), American guitarist and YouTuber
Giuseppe Calderone (1925–1978), influential Sicilian mafioso from Catania
Marina Elvira Calderone (born 1965), Italian politician
Mary Calderone (1904–1998), physician and public health advocate
Victor Calderone (born 1967), house music producer and DJ from Brooklyn, New York
Angelina Calderone (born 1929 or 1930), grandmother of Lady Gaga and father of Joe Germanotta
 Jo Calderone, male alter ego of Lady Gaga

See also 
Calderone Concert Hall, defunct music venue in New York City
Calderone glacier in the Gran Sasso d’Italia mountain group in Abruzzo, Italy
Calderón

Occupational surnames
Italian-language surnames